Daniel Baker may refer to:
 Daniel Baker (businessman), American CEO of FlightAware
 Danny Baker (born 1957), British writer and broadcaster
 Danny Baker, Sinn Fein politician
 Daniel Baker (Presbyterian minister) (1791–1857), Princeton-educated missionary who founded Austin College and Daniel Baker College
 Daniel A. Baker (born 1979), English artist and producer of alternative comics
 Daniel C. Baker (1816–1863), Massachusetts politician and former mayor of Lynn, Massachusetts
 Daniel L. Baker, murder victim of Herman Ashworth
 Daniel N. Baker (born 1947), American space scientist
 Dan Baker (PA announcer) (born 1946), American public address announcer
 Dan Baker (rugby player) (born 1992), Welsh rugby union player
 Dan Baker (Home and Away), fictional character on the Australian soap opera Home and Away
 Dan Baker, or Scanner, a character in the comic book Strikeforce: Morituri
 Daniel Baker, comedian known as Desus or Desus Nice